Raymond Wallace "Corky" Withrow (born November 28, 1937) is a retired American professional baseball player. He played six games in Major League Baseball in 1963 for the St. Louis Cardinals, four as a pinch hitter and two as an outfielder.

Withrow grew up in Central City, Kentucky and graduated from Central City High School there in 1956, at which time he signed with the Milwaukee Braves. While playing minor league baseball, he attended Georgetown College of Kentucky, where he played basketball, then transferred to Kentucky Wesleyan College in 1958.

In the minors, Withrow was a power-hitting outfielder, hitting 34 home runs in the Class D New York–Penn League (1958), 34 homers in the Double-A Texas League (1962), and 29 more in the Triple-A Pacific Coast League (1963). Acquired by the Cardinals from the Denver Bears in September 1963, Withrow made his debut as a pinch hitter for St. Louis pitcher Ron Taylor in the sixth inning on September 6 and was called out on strikes by left-hander Bob Veale of the Pittsburgh Pirates. He started his only MLB game the following day against another southpaw, Joe Gibbon, and recorded his only major league run batted in on a fielder's choice. Altogether, he went hitless in six games played and nine at bats during his brief major league career.

Withrow played in 1,128 minor league games from 1956 through 1966, and batted .260 lifetime.

References

External links
, or Retrosheet

1937 births
Living people
American men's basketball players
Atlanta Crackers players
Austin Senators players
Baseball players from West Virginia
Cedar Rapids Braves players
Dallas Rangers players
Denver Bears players
Evansville Braves players
Evansville White Sox players
Fort Worth Cats players
Georgetown Tigers baseball players
Georgetown Tigers men's basketball players
Jacksonville Braves players
Jacksonville Suns players
Kentucky Wesleyan Panthers baseball players
Major League Baseball outfielders
Mobile Bears players
People from Boone County, West Virginia
People from Central City, Kentucky
Rapiños de Occidente players
Salt Lake City Bees players
St. Louis Cardinals players
Syracuse Chiefs players
Wellsville Braves players